Adam C. Smith is an American politician serving as a member of the Kansas House of Representatives from the 120th district. Elected in November 2016, he assumed office on January 9, 2017.

Early life and education 
Born in Kansas, Smith was raised in the unincorporated community of Weskan. Smith earned a Bachelor of Science degree in animal science, agronomy, and agricultural technology management from Kansas State University.

Career 
Outside of politics, Smith has worked as a farmer and rancher. He was elected to the Kansas House of Representatives in November 2016 and assumed office on January 9, 2017. During the 2019–2020 legislative session, Smith served as vice chair of the House Rural Revitalization Committee. Since 2021, he has served as chair of the House Taxation Committee.

References 

Living people
Republican Party members of the Kansas House of Representatives
People from Wallace County, Kansas
Kansas State University alumni
Year of birth missing (living people)